The second Government of Prime Minister Fatos Nano was the 51st Government of Albania. Although in office for a few weeks, it was considered the first government to emerge from the multi-party elections, as well as the last Labour Party government who had ruled the country for almost 50 years.

History
Aside from Nano, only two ministers were retained. The primary motivation for the change of cabinet was an attempt by the People's Assembly to bolster morale.

Cabinet
The cabinet consisted of 25 members, where in addition to the prime minister, deputy minister and secretary general, there were 19 ministers. 2 were chairpersons of committees and Bujar Kolaneci Chairman of the State Audit Commission.

See also
 Council of Ministers (Albania)

Notes

References

Bibliography

G51
1991 establishments in Albania
Ministries established in 1991